The 1968 California Golden Bears football team was an American football team that represented the University of California, Berkeley in the Pacific-8 Conference (Pac-8) during the 1968 NCAA University Division football season. In their fifth year under head coach Ray Willsey, the Golden Bears compiled a 7–3–1 record (2–2–1 against Pac-8 opponents), finished in fourth place in the Pac-8, and outscored their opponents by a combined total of 243 to 114.

This year's team came to be known as "The Bear Minimum". It was let by Ed White, an All-American and future member of College Hall of Fame. Relying on its defense, Cal went 7-3-1 and ranking as high as eighth in the AP poll. It won 21–7 at Michigan and beat No. 10 Syracuse 43–0. Earning three shutouts it held its opponents to 10.4 points a game. As of 2011, The Bear Minimum still held Cal's records for opponents' average gains per play – 3.60, as well as the fewest rushing touchdowns per season – five (same as the 1937 "Thunder Team"). Its average yards per rush was 2.51 which is still second only to the "Thunder Team" with 2.50 yards per rush.

The team's statistical leaders included Randy Humphries with 1,247 passing yards, Gary Fowler with 665 rushing yards, and Wayne Stewart with 679 receiving yards.

Schedule

Roster

References

California
California Golden Bears football seasons
California Golden Bears football